Elizângela do Amaral Vergueiro (born 11 December 1954) is a Brazilian actress who played a lead role in the 1977 telenovela Locomotivas and has participated in several other telenovelas and films.

Biography 
She was the youngest of three sisters. Her father was an executive and her mother was a housewife. Her parents split up when she was one and a half years old, and so, she had very little contact with her father. Her mother was a manicurist after the separation, and had to bring up the three daughters alone, with a small pension from the ex-husband. Going through difficulties, she then began working as a child, at the age of 8.

Filmography

Awards and nominations

References 

1954 births
Living people
Brazilian telenovela actresses
Brazilian film actresses